The American rock band Circa Survive has released six studio albums, five extended plays, and 16 singles. They have also contributed songs to three different Nirvana tribute compilations.

Studio albums

Extended plays

Singles

Other appearances

Music videos

References 

Discographies of American artists
Rock music group discographies